Basferjan (also Romanized as Bāsferjān; also known as Bāserjān and Bāsfehrjān) is a village in Sharifabad Rural District, in the Central District of Sirjan County, Kerman Province, Iran. At the 2006 census, its population was 1,226, in 279 families.

References 

Populated places in Sirjan County